Salix crenata is a cushion-shaped growing shrub from the genus of willow (Salix) with about 8 millimeter long leaf blades. The natural range of the species is in China.

Description
Salix crenata is a cushion-shaped shrub. The trunk is dull brown, short, twisted and can take root. The twigs are yellowish-brown, young twigs are short but very densely arranged. Young shoots are sparsely hairy and later balding. The vegetative buds are egg-shaped, small and hairless. The leavesgrow close together and cover the branches. The petiole is about 4 millimeters long. The leathery leaf blade is ovate, about 8 millimeters long and usually 3.5, rarely up to 5 millimeters wide. The leaf margin is loosely but regularly serrated in a glandular manner, the leaf base is wedge-shaped, the tip rounded. The upper side of the leaf is green, shiny, glabrous and wrinkled, the underside is greenish and initially shaggy with hair. The central rib is sunk on the top and raised on the bottom.

Very small catkins are formed as inflorescences from around five flowers. The bracts are yellowish green, obovate, membranous, and hairy on the upper side near the base along the leaf margin. The tip of the leaf is rounded. Male flowers have a cylindrical nectar gland adaxially and abaxially, the abaxial gland is thinner and sometimes bilobed. The two stamens are about 3.5 millimeters long and thus about 3 times longer than the bracts. The stamens are hairy at the base, the anthers are yellow. Female flowers have an adaxially lying, cylindrical nectar gland. The ovaryis cylindrical, about 3 millimeters long, stalked long and about the same length as the bracts. The pen is short and two-piece, the scar is bilobed. The capsule fruits are long ovate. Salix crenata flowers in July, the fruits ripen in August and September.

Range
The natural range is in the northwest of the Chinese province of Yunnan and in Tibet. Salix crenata grows in thickets and in crevices at altitudes of 4300 to 4800 meters.

Taxonomy
Salix crenata is a kind from the kind of willow (Salix), in the family of the pasture plants (Salicaceae). There, it is the section Lindleyanae assigned. It was only scientifically describedin 1998 by Fang Zhenfu and Alexey Konstantinovich Skvortsov in Novon, the description of an invalid from Hao Jingsheng sat. No synonyms are known. The generic name Salix comes from Latin and was already used by the Romans for various types of willow. The specific epithet crenata also comes from Latin and means "notched".

Literature
Wu Zheng-yi, Peter H. Raven (Ed.): Flora of China . Volume 4: Cycadaceae through Fagaceae . Science Press / Missouri Botanical Garden Press, Beijing / St. Louis 1999, pp. 211, 214 (English).
Helmut Genaust: Etymological dictionary of botanical plant names. 3rd, completely revised and expanded edition. Nikol, Hamburg 2005, pp. 183, 552 (reprint from 1996).

References 

crenata